HMS Kellington (M1154) was a  of the Royal Navy, launched on 12 October 1954 and named after the village of Kellington in North Yorkshire.

She served as part of 108th mine sweeping squadron based at Malta in 1956, and in January 1957 arrived back in Hythe to join the reserve fleet.

She was converted to a minehunter between 1967 and 1969.

She was decommissioned in 1993 and was handed over to become a training ship for the Sea Cadets on 23 August 1993. She was moored on the River Tees at Stockton on Tees in County Durham. She was purchased outright on 9 February 1999, but closed due to health and safety reasons in 2005.

She was broken up in situ by Able UK in 2009.

References

External links
 HMS Kellington Association website

Ton-class minesweepers of the Royal Navy
Ships built on the River Wear
1954 ships
Cold War minesweepers of the United Kingdom